Il Divo are a multi-national classical crossover vocal group. The male quartet, which originated in the United Kingdom in December 2003, consists of tenors Urs Bühler, David Miller, and Sébastien Izambard. It also included baritone Carlos Marín before his death from COVID-19 in December 2021. Il Divo was created and promoted by Simon Cowell for the label Syco Music (a subsidiary of Sony Music).

As of 2021, the group released ten studio albums: Il Divo (2004), The Christmas Collection (2005), Ancora (2005), Siempre (2006), The Promise (2008), Wicked Game (2011), A Musical Affair (2013), Amor & Pasión (2015), Timeless (2018), and For Once in My Life: A Celebration of Motown (2021); as well as a compilation album, The Greatest Hits (2012). Two other albums – An Evening with Il Divo: Live in Barcelona (2009) and Live in Japan (2014) – presented recordings of live concerts. The group has also collaborated with other artists.

Since its inception, Il Divo has enjoyed success worldwide, selling over 30 million copies of their albums worldwide. With 160 certified gold and platinum hits in 35 countries, the group has pioneered the genre of operatic pop, or "popera", in classical crossover music.

Il Divo's live concerts sold over two million concert tickets worldwide just from the group's first four albums. In its first world tour, concerts in 69 cities in 18 countries were sold out.

Members
Il Divo was composed of four singers, three of whom are classically trained, from four countries: baritone Carlos Marín; two classically trained tenors, Urs Bühler and David Miller; and pop singer-songwriter Sébastien Izambard.

Conception and name
The idea behind Il Divo came when Simon Cowell, inspired after listening to the Three Tenors, decided to form a multinational quartet of talented young singers to recreate the quality of Luciano Pavarotti, José Carreras, and Placido Domingo. Cowell searched worldwide for young singers who were willing to embark on the project from January 21, 2001, to December 16, 2003, when Miller was signed. Prior to Il Divo, each member enjoyed moderate success individually.

Career

2004–2006
The first album, Il Divo, was recorded in February 2004 in Sweden. The album was released on 1 November 2004 in three countries: the UK, Norway and Ireland. In the first few weeks the group achieved double platinum in Norway and Ireland. On 19 April 2005 the album was released in the United States and Spain.

Il Divo was launched in fall 2004 with the single "Regresa a mí", debuting with the first album of the same name. The group filmed the music video for the song in Slovenia.

In December 2004, Il Divo held its first concert at Gotham Hall in New York. The group performed five songs from the album live. The concert was made into a film that became the group's first DVD release, Live at Gotham Hall.

On 23 May 2005, the group released Mama, which features the second official video of the song "Mama" recorded in Tropea, Italy.

On 24 January 2006, Sony BMG released Encore, a concert at the Roman Theatre in Mérida, Spain, recorded on 7 October 2005.

On 25 October 2005, the group released their second studio album The Christmas Collection in seven countries: the United States, Canada, Austria, Slovenia, the Netherlands, Sweden and Finland.

Il Divo's third studio album, Ancora, was released in Europe on 7 November 2005. In the United States and Latin America it was released on 24 January 2006. It debuted at number one on the Billboard 200 in its first week of release in the United States.

On 9 June 2006, Il Divo gave a live performance of the official 2006 FIFA World Cup song, "The Time of Our Lives", with Toni Braxton, at half-time during the opening match between Germany and Costa Rica, and again at the closing ceremony on 9 July.

Il Divo have been on several world tours and have received 50 gold and platinum discs. Their last tour in 2014 covered five continents and over 33 countries. Having completed a six-month tour of the United States, Australia, and Europe, Il Divo participated in Streisand as Barbra Streisand's special guests. The tour was ranked second for all tours during 2006, generating $92.5 million in gross sales. 

After the release of Ancora, the group spent almost half their time as the bestselling act in Europe, building on the success they achieved with their debut self-titled album. Throughout the Christmas period in 2006, Il Divo held the top spot in the list of best-selling albums.

Il Divo was named the Most Multinational UK No.1 Album Group in the 2006 edition of the Guinness Book of World Records.

2006–2010

On 7 November 2006 the group released their first compilation, Il Divo Collezione.

On 27 November 2006 they released their fourth studio album, Siempre, recorded during their previous world tour. On 16 January 2007, Il Divo began a tour to promote Siempre in Asia, Australia, Latin America Mexico, Colombia, Chile, Argentina, and Venezuela. On 21 November 2006 Il Divo released the Live at the Greek Theater DVD featuring the live concert held on 22 June 2006 at the Greek Theatre in Los Angeles as part of the 2006 world tour. This recording includes all the songs that had established the group's popularity and an unedited version of the famous song "Somewhere".

On 11 November 2008 the group released their fifth album, The Promise. The album's presentation was held at the Museu Nacional d'Art de Catalunya on 30 October, where Il Divo performed five songs from the new album.

At the Coliseum was released on 8 November 2008. It includes Il Divo's concert at the Roman Colosseum in Pula, Croatia.

On 12 December 2008, Il Divo performed at the finals of Idol 2008 in the Stockholm Globe Arena. On 20 January 2009 they performed at the Purple Heart Inauguration Ball in Washington DC for Barack Obama. Il Divo's 2009 tour, An Evening with Il Divo, was their most geographically extensive, with more than 130 dates across six continents, visiting 31 countries and 81 cities, earning them the Billboard Breakthrough Award for the highest-grossing tour of the year.

On 1 December 2009, the first live album An Evening with Il Divo: Live in Barcelona went public. The DVD + CD set includes "Bridge Over Trouble Water" and "The Impossible Dream" from Man of La Mancha.

They ended 2009 with their first Christmas special intimate show, Celebrate Christmas with Il Divo, which included a traditional repertoire of favourite festive songs with an orchestra and special guests in the United Kingdom, the United States, and Canada.

They started with two concerts at the Hammersmith Apollo in London on 7 and 8 December with violinist Vanessa-Mae and singer Camilla Kerslake, ending in the United States with six more concerts.

On 19 October 2010, Sony Music released The Yule Log: The Christmas Collection.

Artist of the Decade

On 11 May 2011, Il Divo were invited to the Classic Brit Awards at the Royal Albert Hall in London to receive the award for "Artist of the Decade". The award recognised the impact the operatic group had had in the classical genre, having sold over 25 million albums worldwide between 2004 and 2011.

On 8 November 2011, Wicked Game was released.

On 20 December 2011 in Paraguay, the quartet gave a concert in the Defensores del Chaco stadium for 33,900 people, closing the Bicentenary of the Independence of Paraguay. On 13 May 2012, Il Divo performed "Caruso" during the Diamond Jubilee of Elizabeth II at Windsor for the entire royal family. In 2008, Il Divo performed at the Olympic torch handover party leading up to the 2012 Summer Olympics in London.

Live in London, a 90-minute Il Divo concert at the London Coliseum, was published in mid-2011.

Il Divo & Orchestra in Concert World Tour was a worldwide tour of the six continents between May and September 2012. It was designed by creative director Brian Burke, who stated that "Il Divo is the perfect modern fusion of opera, theater, and concert. It is a privilege as a director to create a visual landscape inviting the audience on a theatrical journey of their music."

In November 2012, Il Divo released The Greatest Hits.

Il Divo on Broadway
The group's seventh album, A Musical Affair, was released on 5 November 2013. The songs featured arrangements tailored to the singers' voices. To promote the album, they held a concert at the Marquis Theatre on Broadway from 7 to 13 November 2013, called Il Divo – A Musical Affair: The Greatest Songs of Broadway.

The world tour began in Japan in February 2014 and travelled around the world, ending on 1 November 2014 at the O2 Arena in Greenwich, London. On 19 July 2014, Il Divo sold out Edinburgh Castle, giving a concert featuring "Amazing Grace".

On 24 November 2014, a special edition of A Musical Affair was released, which includes new songs with French singers, partially or fully sung in French. On 1 December 2014, Live in Japan was released, which contains the A Musical Affair tour filmed at the Nippon Budokan Theater in Tokyo on 11 March 2014. The Japanese version includes the songs "Flowers Will Bloom" and "Furusato".

In 2014, on the 10th anniversary of the publication of their first album, the group sold over 28 million albums worldwide, achieving more than 50 number one sales and receiving 160 gold records and platinum in over 33 countries.

On 23 March 2015, it was announced that Il Divo was the winner of the 2015 Silver Clef Award, giving them the Classic PPL Nordoff Robbins Classical Award. The gala award ceremony took place on 3 July at the Grosvenor House Hotel.

Amor & Pasión
Through Syco Music, on 6 November 2015 in Europa, 27 November in America and 25 October in Japan, Il Divo released Amor & Pasión.

On 21 October, Il Divo performed the first public appearance to promote the sixth album on the program Despierta America, the US network Univision, from Miami, playing his first single "Si voy a perderte (Don't Wanna Lose You)". They then performed the song "Bésame mucho" in Japan. They started the month of November in London, where they attended the second Music Industry Trust Awards.

Amor & Pasión debuted atop the US Latin Albums chart, with 5,000 copies sold in America in the first week, according to Billboard. In Spain, the album debuted at number 10 on the Top 100 Álbumes list.

Death of Carlos Marin
Carlos Marin died of COVID-19 on 19 December 2021. As a tribute, Il Divo performed a Greatest Hits Tour in 2022, with Mexican-American baritone Steven Labrie joining the group but not as a member.

Notable performances
In 2008, Il Divo performed on the occasion of the Olympic torch hand-over four years prior to the 2012 Summer Olympics.
On 12 December 2008, Il Divo performed at the Swedish Idol 2008 finale in the Globen Arena in Stockholm.
20 January 2009 they performed at the Commander-in-Chief's Ball in Washington, D.C., for US President Barack Obama.
The Paraguay show was Il Divo's largest-capacity performance to date and took place on 20 December 2011, at the Defensores del Chaco Stadium in Asuncion, for 33,900 people.
On 13 May 2012, the group performed during the Diamond Jubilee of Elizabeth II at Windsor for the entire royal family of the United Kingdom.
On 19 July 2014, Il Divo performed before a capacity crowd at Edinburgh Castle esplanade where a pop festival took place ahead of the 2014 Commonwealth Games. The group performed "Amazing Grace".
On 5 July 2015, while recording their eighth album, Il Divo performed at the Astana Concert Hall in Astana, Kazakhstan, in honour of the 17th anniversary of the Day of Capital.

Collaborations
In 2009, they performed "Sortilegio de amor" for the soundtrack of the telenovela Sortilegio, which earned them nominations and awards at the Mexico TvyNovelas Awards for Best Musical Theme for "Sortilegio".
 In 2013 they recorded a duet with Engelbert Humperdinck entitled "Spanish Eyes".
In 2015 Il Divo recorded a duet with Juan Gabriel entitled "Amor Eterno" (Eternal Love).
In December 2015, the version of "Ode to Joy" sung by Il Divo was chosen to be the main theme of the soundtrack of the 2016 Japanese film Everest.

Tours
 2004: Il Divo Tour
 2006: Streisand: The Tour and Il Divo 2006 World Tour, Ancora
 2007: Il Divo World Tour
 2008: Il Divo Global Tour
 2009: An Evening with Il Divo – World Tourand Celebrate Christmas with Il Divo
 2011: Il Divo Tour, Wicked Game
 2012: Il Divo & Orchestra in Concert – World Tour
 2013: A Musical Affair en el Teatro Marquis de Broadway
 2014: A Musical Affair Tourand The Best of Il Divo – World Tour
 2016: Amor & Pasión Tour
 2017: A Night with the Best of Il Divo
 2018: Timeless Tour
 2022: Greatest Hits Tour (ft. Steven Labrie) and  For Once in My Life: A Celebration of Motown Tour (ft. Steven Labrie)

Artistry

Styling
Besides music, the members of Il Divo are also known for their refined and elegant appearance, wearing almost exclusively suits by Giorgio Armani (Giorgio Armani, Emporio Armani and Armani Collezioni).

Musical style
Il Divo changed the genre of opera with their musical combination of opera singing and classical music, with themes of different genres, including Latin, folk, ballads, church music, bolero and pop.

Multilingual
Il Divo records their songs in several languages: Spanish ("Regresa A Mí", "Hasta Mi Final", "La Vida Sin Amor"), English ("Mama", "Amazing Grace", "Don't Cry For Me Argentina"), Italian ("Senza Parole", "Passera", "Notte Di Luce"), French ("Pour Que Tu M'Aimes Encore", "Le Temps des Cathedrales"), Latin ("Panis Angelicus"), Portuguese ("Volta Pra Mim"), and Japanese ("Furusato"). Some songs incorporate more than one language in the same song, such as "The Man You Love" (Spanish and English), "Ave Maria" (Italian and Latin), and "I Believe In You" (English & French), whereas others are recorded in a single language, but sung live in two languages: "She" (Italian & English) and "Bring Him Home" (English & Spanish).

Most of the songs that they cover are reinterpreted from English and translated into the Spanish language, as the group have said that "Spanish is the language of Romanticism".

Other activities

Philanthropy
On 25 April 2007, Il Divo performed on American Idol in one of the "Idol Gives Back" episodes, which raised money for children in the US and Africa. For every vote cast during that show, Idol sponsors Coca-Cola, AT&T, and others donated money to the Charity Projects Entertainment Fund and other groups such as Save the Children and America's Second Harvest.

In 2011, they recorded "We Wish You a Merry Christmas" to raise money for the organisation Save the Children.

Il Divo is related indirectly in terms of sponsorship and help with the French NGO SMTA Assistance Médicale Toit du Monde since 2005, of which Izambard is the international official sponsor, and with Sanfilippo Children's Foundation, for which Izambard is the global ambassador.

Between 20 and 30 September 2015, Miller and Bühler participated in a motorbike ride from Miami to Los Angeles to raise funds for the Nordoff Robbins music therapy charity.

Discography

Studio albums
 Il Divo (2004)
 The Christmas Collection (2005)
 Ancora (2005)
 Siempre (2006)
 The Promise (2008)
 Wicked Game (2011)
 A Musical Affair (2013)
 Amor & Pasión (2015)
 Timeless (2018)
 For Once in My Life: A Celebration of Motown (2021)

Videography

References

Bibliography
Allegra Rossi, Romancing The World, Hardback 128 pages, 10 November 2005, Orion publishers
Il Divo, Our Music, Our Journey, Our Words, Paperback 192 pages, 6 September 2007, Headline Book Publishing

External links

  Official Website Il Divo
 
 

 
Musical groups established in 2004
Opera crossover singers
Sony BMG artists
Vocal quartets
Ballad music groups